Abderraouf Othmani (born 14 June 2001) is an Algerian footballer who plays for USM Alger in the Algerian Ligue Professionnelle 1.

Career
Abderraouf Othmani his first match was in the Ligue 1 against NA Hussein Dey, while he was with the reserve team, On 21 August 2021, in the first match as a starter against CR Belouizdad, Othmani scored his first goals despite the defeat. In the summer 2021, Othmani was promoted to USM Alger's first team. On 4 March 2022 Othmani was under contract with USMA until September 2023. But completely satisfied with his performance, the club's management decided to extend the player now, without waiting for the old contract to expire and signed a new contract until 2024.

Career statistics

Club

References

External links
 

2001 births
Living people
21st-century Algerian people
USM Alger players
Algerian footballers
Association football forwards
Footballers from Algiers
Algerian Ligue Professionnelle 1 players